Samuel Ferran Glenfield (born 1954) is an Irish Anglican bishop. Glenfield is the current  Bishop of Kilmore, Elphin and Ardagh.

Personal life
Glenfield is married to Jean, a teacher at Wesley College Dublin.They have three children.

Education and ecclesiastical career

Glenfield was educated at Queen's University Belfast and Trinity College, Dublin and ordained in 1992. His first post was a curacy at  Douglas, County Cork. He then served incumbencies in Rathcooney, Kill O'The Grange (County Dublin) and Hillsborough.

Since Glenfield's installation he has been instrumental in reforming the administrative councils that comprise the Diocese of Kilmore, Elphin and Ardagh. He is a conservative evangelical renowned for his biblical teaching, before elevation to the episcopate.

He is a supporter of Anglican realignment and in 2014 visited the Anglican Diocese of South Carolina, which left the Episcopal Church of the United States as a result of doctrinal differences. He attended GAFCON III, held on 17–22 June 2018, in Jerusalem. This move was criticized by some members of the clergy.

Notes

1954 births
Alumni of Queen's University Belfast
Alumni of Trinity College Dublin
21st-century Anglican bishops in Ireland
Bishops of Kilmore, Elphin and Ardagh
Living people
Alumni of Queens' College, Cambridge
Evangelical Anglican bishops
Anglican realignment people